Notre-Dame-de-Montauban is a municipality in the Mauricie region in Quebec, Canada. The municipality is on the northern edge of Mékinac Regional County Municipality and the administrative region of Mauricie and includes the population centres of Notre-Dame-des-Anges and Montauban-les-Mines.

Tourist activities and the resort are significant industries today. The marked trails for recreational vehicles (snowmobile, ATV, etc.), the hunting, fishing and forest walks attract many visitors. Nine out of the fall of the Batiscan River is the major tourist attraction. On the west bank, the municipality has built a beautiful park with a gateway to reach a large rock in the middle of the fall.

At Notre-Dame-de-Montauban, the population is approximately 850, with a median age of 45 years. The most significant age group is 25-44. In summer season, the population doubles because of country cottages. The town has two Catholic places of worship, the church of Notre-Dame-des-Anges (Our Lady of the Angels) and the chapel of Montauban.

Geography 

Batiscan river flowing from north to south, divides the city in two. The village of Notre-Dame-des-Anges is located on the east side of the river, downstream from the breathtaking falls new. While the village of Montauban-les-Mines is located in the east, near the limit of Saint-Ubalde, Quebec. The village of Notre-Dame-de-Montauban is part of the Batiscanie, Quebec, being in the watershed Batiscan River. However, an area at the southeast of the municipal territory, at the limit of Saint-Ubalde, Quebec, is rather dependent on the watershed Sainte-Anne River.

Economy 

The railway from Hervey-Jonction to Chambord (Lac Saint-Jean) has contributed greatly to the economic growth of Notre-Dame-des-Anges sector. The railway station was built on the West side of Batiscan River.

Historically, the local economy was mainly based on agriculture and forestry. The agricultural zone occupies about 8% of the municipal territory in the area, nearly 44% is cultivated and 51% in oak. Some pastures are also intended for breeding cattle. While the Montauban-les-Mines area experienced an economic boom in the mining industry, since the beginning of 20th Century.

In the history of Notre-Dame-de-Montauban, 34 sawmills have been identified. "Scierie Montauban" (Montauban sawmill) turns to be the major business in the area and only sawmill to survive. Other local SMEs operating specialize in construction, mechanical equipment and cabinetry.

Municipal timeline 

 1882: Constitution of the "municipality of Notre-Dame-des-Anges-de-Montauban" from the unorganized Portneuf territories.
 24: The "municipality of the parish of Saint-Rémi" stands "Notre-Dame-des-Anges-de-Montauban".
 1919: The "municipality of Notre-Dame-des-Anges" stands "Notre-Dame-des-Anges-de-Montauban".
 1919: The "village municipality of Montauban" stands "Notre-Dame-des-Anges-de-Montauban".
 1969: Fusion between "Notre-Dame-des-Anges" and "Notre-Dame-des-Anges-de-Montauban" to form the "municipality of Notre-Dame-des-Anges".
 3: Fusion between "Notre-Dame-des-Anges and Montauban" to form the municipality of "Notre-Dame-de-Montauban".

Religious chronology 
 January 1, 2018 - Creation of the new "fabrique" of the parish of Saint-Coeur-de-Marie, merging the factories of Notre-Dame-des-Anges, Saint-Éloi-les-Mines, Saint- Rémi-du-Lac-aux-Sables, St. Leopold of Hervey-Junction, St. Thecla and St. Adelphe.
 June 10, 2018 - Inauguration of the new factory in the presence of the Bishop of the Diocese of Trois-Rivières Mgr. Luc Bouchard.

Demographics

Population trend:

Private dwellings occupied by usual residents: 443 (total dwellings: 731)

Mother language of Sainte-Thècle's citizens:
 French as first language: 100%
 English as first language: 0.0%
 English and French as first language: 0.0%
 Other as first language: 0.0%

See also 

 Batiscanie, Quebec
 Batiscan River
 Charest River
 Charest lake
 Portneuf Wildlife Reserve
 Portneuf County, Quebec (provincial riding)
 Mékinac Regional County Municipality (RCM)

References

External links

Incorporated places in Mauricie
Municipalities in Quebec
Mékinac Regional County Municipality